Elsie Lincoln (Vandergrift) Benedict (1885–1970) was advertised as the best-known women's speaker during the 1920s, speaking to over 3 million people in her lifetime and writing on what Napoleon Hill and Dale Carnegie and a long list of men would do later. She was an American suffragist leader representing the State of Colorado for the Women's Right to Vote and later recruited by Carrie Chapman Catt to be the second highest-paid women's suffragist leader to take to the national scene. She promoted the law of attraction through her many worldwide lectures. She was the founder of Brainology, a famous course on scientific mind training.

Early life and education 
Benedict was born on November 1, 1885, in Osborne, Kansas to William and Adella (Allen) Vandergrift. She was a student at Denver University, Denver, Colorado between 1905 and 1907; Columbia University, Chicago, Illinois; Radcliffe College, Cambridge, Massachusetts specializing in psychology and anthropology. In 1914, married Ralph Paine Benedict, of Boston, Massachusetts, a Harvard graduate. Formerly writer for Denver Evening Post and other newspapers, Chautauqua lecturer, an organizer for National American Woman Suffrage Association, Founder 1918 Benedict School of Opportunity (lecture and correspondent courses), headquarters in New York and San Francisco, Member National Association of Pen Women, National Association Business and Professional Women, Author.

During her college career, she held over 12 gold medals for oratory. She was the first woman to win a place in an intercollegiate debate team.

Career 
In 1909, Colorado Governor John F. Shafroth appointed her the official reporter of the Colorado Senate. After serving this capacity for three years, she was appointed Chief of the Advertising Department of the State Land Office. In 1913, she resigned to become a political editor of the Denver Press and later of the Denver Post, the largest daily in Colorado at the time. She married her husband, Ralph Paine Benedict, on November 1, 1914, by Judge Ben B. Lindsey of Colorado.  Progressive Judge Ben Lindsey wrote of Mrs. Benedict's speaking efforts on woman's suffrage, "Mrs. Benedict is one of the best known of our progressive Denver woman.  She has held positions of trust and responsibility and for several years has been on the editorial staff of leading Denver newspapers in the most important capacities. She is one of the real genuine women of Denver, who has always stood for right and justice."

Women's suffrage leader Carrie Chapman Catt noted that "Mrs. Benedict's progress has been phenomenal" and characterized her as the most capable organizer and the most eloquent speaker the national suffrage movement had. On July 4, 2017, Mrs. Benedict delivered Mrs. Catt's "Patriotic Appeal" at Exposition park, Rochester, NY to an audience of 15,000 personas in such an effective matter that she received an ovation.

She drew big audiences here in the pre-World War II decades, discussing a wide variety of subjects from choosing personality colors in clothes to fit the individual, to doing well in marriage and in business. In a 1922 lecture at Scottish Rite Auditorium, she commented, “Most people use less brains in selecting the person with whom they are to spend their lives than they do in choosing an automobile, a bicycle or a cut of steak.  Love isn't enough; there must also be understanding.”

Benedict served as head of the Benedict School of Opportunity, "The Traveling University for Men and Women", was founder of International Opportunity League, and president of the Elsie Lincoln Benedict Club. In her lifetime, she traveled to 55 countries and her book, "Our Trip Around the World", was considered the most extensive travel book of its time.  She recorded her travels, not only in her writings, but in her postcard and scrapbook collection.

In 1922, Elsie had already achieved her goal in becoming a millionaire before the age of 30 and built a cobblestone cottage home in the Carmel Highlands, California, with breathtaking views of the Pacific Ocean which served as a quiet and spiritual place which she and Ralph could continue their writings and host friends. A 1929 postcard taken by photographer, L.S. Slevin, featured the exterior of her cobblestone cottage named  "House by the Side of the Road".  In May 1926, American Evangelist and Four Square founder, Aimee Semple McPherson, disappeared for months and the case remains unsolved.  In the trial following her reappearance, five witnesses testified they saw Aimee at the Benedict cottage in the Carmel Highlands.  In Don Ryan's 1927 book, Angel's Flight, he writes of both Elsie Lincoln Benedict and Aimee Semple McPherson within the same few pages as both being prominent, influential and motivating female leaders of the time.  Because Aimee was very careful not to associate in public with those people that her religious followers would see as suspect, personal friendships were kept in private. Elsie's work drew heavily on the deep American metaphysical tradition, and Aimee would have kept her distance from that (as she kept her distance from Theosophy, Christian Science, etc.) of a public relationship to Elsie.

In 1932, Elsie and Ralph adopted a son, Anthony Gorman, whom she renamed Elson (Elsie's son), while lecturing in Sydney, Australia.  In 1934, at the age of 15, he was the youngest student at the time to be accepted into California State Institute of Technology. While at Caltech's Jet Propulsion Laboratory, he developed the first Squib for NASA and corresponded with Albert Einstein. Anthony left Caltech to fly in the Royal Australian Air Force (ANZAC) in Libya after World War II. Anthony married and returned to the United States to raise his family of two daughters and one son.

Elsie's husband, Ralph Benedict died in 1941.  Devastated by the loss of her husband, Elsie retired from public life.  She spent the rest of her life traveling the world and visiting family.  She died in San Francisco, California on February 15, 1970. She shares a crypt with her husband at Forest Lawn in Glendale, California in the Gardenia Terrace.  Luigi Kleinsasser's dedicates his 2012 book,  "The Book of Life: Find Your Perfect Self, Job, Partner, Life" to the inspiration and research of Elsie Lincoln and Ralph Paine Benedict.

In 2004, she was inducted to the Osborne, Kansas County Hall of Fame. In 2013, her original travel scrapbooks, pictures, journal, lecture award trophies, and her 300-page manuscript on Australia was returned to her family heirs as they came across it on EBay just three days before the auction was ending. True to Elsie's writings, "There are no accidents. Everything that happens in our individual world, just as every occurrence in the material universe, is brought about by the operation of law."  Her works are currently undergoing republishing by her family, which still owns the copyright to her works from 1923 and beyond. The Elsie Lincoln Vandergrift Memorial Scholarship was established at the University of Denver to a student who shows promise and accomplishment in psychology.

Works 

Benedict authored the following books:

 Human Analysis (1919); 
 Practical Psychology (1920);
 Famous Lovers (1927); 
 The Spell of the South Seas (1930);
 Inspirational Poems (1931); 
 Stimulating Stories (1931); 
 Benedictines (1931); 
 So This Is Australia (1932); 
 Spain Before It Happened (1937);

With Ralph Benedict 

 How to Analyze People on Sight – The Five Human Types (1921); 
 The Development of Personality (1922);
 Unlocking the Subconscious (1922);
 How To Get Anything You Want (1923); 
 Scientific Mind Training (1925);
 How to Make More Money (1925);
 Child Training (1926);
 Our Trip Around the World (1926);
 Public Speaking (1927);
 Brainology: Understanding, Developing and Training Your Brain (1928).

Contemporary accolades 

"Elsie Lincoln Benedict has a brilliant record.  She is like a fresh breath of Colorado ozone. Her ideas are as stimulating as the health-giving breezes of the Rockies."–New York Evening Mail, April 16, 1914.
"Elsie Lincoln Benedict is known nationally, having conducted lecture courses in many of the large Eastern cities. Her work is based upon the practical methods of modern science as worked out in the world's leading laboratories where exhaustive tests are applied to determine individual types, talents, vocational bents and possibilities."–San Francisco Bulletin, January 25, 1919.
"Several hundred people were turned away from the Masonic Temple last night where Elsie Lincoln Benedict, famous human analyst, spoke on How to Analyze People on Sight. Asked how she could draw and hold a crowd of 3,000 for a lecture, she said: ‘Because I talk on the one subject on earth in which every individual is most interested – himself.’"–Seattle Times, June 2, 1920.
"Elsie Lincoln Benedict is a woman who has studied deeply under genuine scientists and is demonstrating to thousands at the Auditorium each evening that she knows the connection between an individual's external characteristics and his inner traits."–Minneapolis News, November 7, 1920.
"Over fifty thousand people heard Elsie Lincoln Benedict at the City Auditorium during her six weeks lecture engagement in Milwaukee."– Milwaukee Leader, April 2, 1921.
"The Wonder Woman, because she actually MAKES OVER THE LIVES of those who follow her wonderful, powerful teachings." - Oakland Tribune, July 2, 1923. 
"Elsie Lincoln Benedict, speaker and writer, has addressed more people as a lecturer than anyone on the American platform, with the exception of Billy Sunday." - San Francisco Chronicle, May 14, 1925.
"Over three million people in all parts of the globe have heard this human, helpful woman.  Over 200,000 are life members." - Milwaukee Journal, September 10, 1926.

Photo gallery

References

External links
 
 
 

American women psychologists
20th-century American psychologists
1885 births
1970 deaths
People from Osborne, Kansas
Radcliffe College alumni